Salem is an unincorporated community in Madison Township, Jay County, Indiana.

Salem was founded in 1837.

Geography

References

Unincorporated communities in Jay County, Indiana
Unincorporated communities in Indiana